Dzmitry Kharytonaw (born 12 April 1997) is a Belarusian professional footballer who plays for Vitebsk.

Career
On 16 January 2020, the BFF banned Kharytonaw for 12 months for his involvement in the match fixing.

References

External links 
 
 

1997 births
Living people
Belarusian footballers
Association football goalkeepers
FC Vitebsk players
FC Orsha players
FC Naftan Novopolotsk players
FC Slutsk players